MBO is a Thai record label and a subsidiary of GMM Grammy that focuses on pop, dance-pop and pop rock music genre.

History 
MBO was formed in late 2015 as GMM Grammy aimed to expand their music content and increase their music revenue by targeting more teenage audiences. It also aimed to be Thailand's leading youth entertainment platform with a greater focus on the artist than on production according to  who was then GMM Grammy's executive vice president for music production and promotion. In terms of promotion, MBO is focused on tapping social media channels where most of the younger audience are.

Hathai Sarawutpaiboon, who was with Kamikaze prior to joining MBO, previously served as its managing director. She later moved to 4Nologue where she helped in forming the Thai boy group Nine by Nine.

Roster

Current acts 
  (Jida)
  (Peem)
 Pamiga Sooksawee (Pam)
 Yanin Opassataworn (Ninna)
 Niwirin Limkangwalmongkol (Bambam)

References

External links 

GMM Grammy
Thai record labels
Pop record labels